Leuculodes lacteolaria is a moth of the Doidae family. It is found in neotropical Central America, north to Arizona.

External links
Images
Butterflies and Moths of North America
Moths of Southeastern Arizona

Doidae